Bartonella senegalensis is a Gram-negative, aerobic, rod-shaped, catalase- and oxidase-negative non-spore-forming, non-motile bacteria from the genus Bartonella which was isolated from the tick Ornithodoros sonrai in Senegal in Africa.

References

External links
Type strain of Bartonella senegalensis at BacDive -  the Bacterial Diversity Metadatabase

Bartonellaceae
Bacteria described in 2014